Tatarskaya Urada (Tatar Uraźı) is a rural locality (a village) in Novoartaulsky Selsoviet, Yanaulsky District, Bashkortostan, Russia. The population was 269 as of 2010. There are 5 streets.

Geography 
Tatarskaya Urada is located 10 km north of Yanaul (the district's administrative centre) by road. Tash-Yelga is the nearest rural locality. рядом протекает река буй.

References 

Rural localities in Yanaulsky District